Ahlam al-Nasr is a Syrian Arabic poet, and is known as "the Poetess of the Islamic State". Her first book of poetry, The Blaze of Truth, was published in 2014 and consists of 107 poems written in monorhyme. She is considered one of the Islamic State's most famous propagandists and gives detailed defenses of terrorist acts.

History
She comes from Damascus and is in her early 20s. She was raised in Saudi Arabia where she attended a private school in al-Khobar. Her mother has written that al-Nasr “was born with a dictionary in her mouth.” After the Syrian civil war began, she left Syria to one of the Gulf states but returned in 2014, arriving in Raqqa.

On October 11, 2014, she was married in the courthouse of Raqqa, Syria to Mohamed Mahmoud, known as Abu Usama al-Gharib, an Austrian Vienna-born preacher.

According to Cole Bunzel, a Ph.D. candidate in Near Eastern Studies at Princeton University, many of her poems are published weekly by the al-Sumud Media Foundation.

Family
Her grandfather is Mustafa al-Bugha, the Syrian imam renowned for his public support of Bashar al-Assad. Her mother is Dr. Iman Mustafa al-Bugha, a university professor of fiqh at the University of Dammam, Saudi Arabia. She was the one who encouraged her daughter to learn poetry from an early age. Her brother is also believed to be with her in Syria.

References

Arabic-language women poets
Arabic-language poets
Islamic State of Iraq and the Levant propagandists
Islamic State of Iraq and the Levant members from Syria
Living people
Year of birth missing (living people)
People from Damascus
Syrian Islamists
Syrian propagandists
21st-century poets
Syrian women poets
21st-century Syrian women writers
21st-century Syrian writers